Kurdish state may refer to:
 The Kurdish state (1918–1919), a historical polity in southern Kurdistan.
 A hypothetical state spanning all of Kurdistan. See Kurdish nationalism and Kurdistan.